DXBF (101.7 FM), broadcasting as 101.7 Prime FM, is a radio station owned and operated by Prime Broadcasting Network. Its studios and transmitters are located at Brgy. Mangagoy, Bislig.

References

Radio stations in Surigao del Sur